David Wark Griffith (January 22, 1875 – July 23, 1948) was an American film director. Considered one of the most influential figures in the history of the motion picture, he pioneered many aspects of film editing and expanded the art of the narrative film.

Griffith is known to modern audiences primarily for directing the film The Birth of a Nation (1915). One of the most financially successful films of all time, it made investors enormous profits, but it also attracted much controversy for its degrading portrayals of African Americans, its glorification of the Ku Klux Klan and support to the Confederacy, and its racist viewpoint. The film led to riots in several major cities all over the United States, and the NAACP attempted to have the film banned. Griffith made his next film Intolerance (1916) as an answer to critics, who he felt unfairly maligned his work.

Together with Charlie Chaplin, Mary Pickford, and Douglas Fairbanks, Griffith founded the studio United Artists in 1919 with the goal of enabling actors and directors to make films on their own terms as opposed to the terms of commercial studios. Several of Griffith's later films were successful, including Broken Blossoms (1919), Way Down East (1920), and Orphans of the Storm (1921), but the high costs he incurred for production and promotion often led to commercial failure. He had made roughly 500 films by the time of his final feature, The Struggle (1931), all but three of which were completely silent.

Griffith has a complicated legacy. Although far from universally so, he was a widely celebrated and respected figure in his lifetime, and modern film historians still recognize him for his technical contributions to the craft of filmmaking. Nevertheless, many critics have characterized both Griffith and his work (most notably, The Birth of a Nation) as white supremacist, both during his life and in the decades that have followed since his death. Historians frequently cite The Birth of a Nation as a major factor in the KKK's revival in the 20th century, and it remains largely condemned to this day.

Early life

Griffith was born on January 22, 1875, on a farm in Oldham County, Kentucky, the son of Jacob Wark "Roaring Jake" Griffith, a Confederate Army colonel in the American Civil War who was elected as a Kentucky state legislator, and Mary Perkins (née Oglesby). Griffith was raised as a Methodist, and he attended a one-room schoolhouse, where he was taught by his older sister Mattie. His father died when he was 10, and the family struggled with poverty.

When Griffith was 14, his mother abandoned the farm and moved the family to Louisville, Kentucky; there she opened a boarding house, which was unsuccessful. Griffith then left high school to help support the family, taking a job in a dry goods store and later in a bookstore. He began his creative career as an actor in touring companies. Meanwhile, he was learning how to become a playwright, but he had little success. Only one of his plays was accepted for a performance. He traveled to New York City in 1907 in an attempt to sell a script to Edison Studios producer Edwin Porter; although Porter rejected the script, he gave Griffith an acting part in Rescued from an Eagle's Nest instead. As a result of this experience, Griffith decided to try his luck as an actor, and he appeared in many films as an extra.

Early film career 

In 1908, Griffith accepted a role as a stage extra in Professional Jealousy for the American Mutoscope and Biograph Company, where he met cameraman Billy Bitzer, and his career in the film industry changed forever. In 1908, Biograph's main director Wallace McCutcheon Sr. fell ill, and his son Wallace McCutcheon Jr. took his place. McCutcheon Jr. did not bring the studio success; Biograph co-founder Harry Marvin then gave Griffith the position, and he made the short The Adventures of Dollie. He directed a total of 48 shorts for the company that year.

Among the films he directed in 1909 was The Cricket on the Hearth, an adaptation of Charles Dickens' novel. Showing the influence of Dickens on his own film narrative, Griffith employed the technique of cross-cutting—where two stories run alongside each other, as seen in Dickens' novels such as Oliver Twist. When criticized by a cameraman for doing this in a later film, Griffith was said to have replied, "Well, doesn't Dickens write that way?".

His short In Old California (1910) was the first film shot in Hollywood, California. Four years later, he produced and directed his first feature film Judith of Bethulia (1914), one of the earliest films to be produced in the US. Biograph believed that longer features were not viable at this point. According to Lillian Gish, the company thought that "a movie that long would hurt [the audience's] eyes".

Griffith left Biograph because of company resistance to his goals and his cost overruns on the film. He took his company of actors with him and joined the Mutual Film Corporation. There he co-produced The Life of General Villa, a silent biographical-action movie starring Pancho Villa as himself, shot on location in Mexico during a civil war. He formed a studio with Majestic Studios manager Harry Aitken, which became known as Reliance-Majestic Studios and later was renamed Fine Arts Studios. His new production company became an autonomous production unit partner in the Triangle Film Corporation along with Thomas H. Ince and Keystone Studios' Mack Sennett. The Triangle Film Corporation was headed by Aitken, who was released from the Mutual Film Corporation, and his brother Roy.

Griffith directed and produced The Clansman through Reliance-Majestic Studios in 1915. The film later became known as The Birth of a Nation. It is one of the early feature length American films. The film was a success, but it aroused much controversy due to its depiction of slavery, the Ku Klux Klan, race relations in the American Civil War, and the Reconstruction era of the United States. It was based on Thomas Dixon Jr.'s 1905 novel The Clansman: A Historical Romance of the Ku Klux Klan; it depicts Southern slavery as benign, the enfranchisement of freedmen as a corrupt plot by the Republican Party, and the Ku Klux Klan as a band of heroes restoring the rightful order. This view of the era was popular at the time and was endorsed for decades by historians of the Dunning School, although it met with strong criticism from the National Association for the Advancement of Colored People (NAACP) and other groups.

The NAACP attempted to stop showings of the film. This was successful in some cities, but nonetheless it was shown widely and became the most successful box-office attraction of its time. It is considered among the first "blockbuster" motion pictures, and it broke all box-office records that had been established until then. "They lost track of the money it made", Lillian Gish remarked in a Kevin Brownlow interview.

Audiences in some major northern cities rioted over the film's racial content and the violence. Griffith's indignation at efforts to censor or ban the film motivated him the following year to produce Intolerance, in which he portrayed the effects of intolerance in four different historical periods: the Fall of Babylon; the Crucifixion of Jesus; the events surrounding the St. Bartholomew's Day massacre (during religious persecution of French Huguenots); and a modern story. Intolerance was not a financial success; it did not bring in enough profits to cover the lavish road show that accompanied it. Griffith put a huge budget into the film's production that could not be recovered in its box office. He mostly financed Intolerance himself, which contributed to his financial ruin for the rest of his life.

Griffith's production partnership was dissolved in 1917, and he went to Artcraft, part of Paramount Pictures, and then to First National Pictures (1919–1920). At the same time, he founded United Artists together with Charlie Chaplin, Mary Pickford, and Douglas Fairbanks; the studio was premised on allowing actors to control their own interests rather than being dependent upon commercial studios.

He continued to make films, but he never again achieved box-office grosses as high as either The Birth of a Nation or Intolerance.

Later film career 
Though United Artists survived as a company, Griffith's association with it was short lived. While some of his later films did well at the box office, commercial success often eluded him. Griffith features from this period include Broken Blossoms (1919), Way Down East (1920), Orphans of the Storm (1921), Dream Street (1921), One Exciting Night (1922), and America (1924). Of these, the first three were successes at the box office. Griffith was forced to leave United Artists after Isn't Life Wonderful (1924) failed at the box office.

He made a part talkie, Lady of the Pavements (1929), and only two full-sound films: Abraham Lincoln (1930) and The Struggle (1931). Neither was successful, and after The Struggle he never made another film.

In 1936, director Woody Van Dyke, who had worked as Griffith's apprentice on Intolerance, asked Griffith to help him shoot the famous earthquake sequence for San Francisco, but Griffith was not given any film credit. Starring Clark Gable, Jeanette MacDonald and Spencer Tracy, it was the top-grossing film of the year.

In 1939, the producer Hal Roach hired Griffith to produce Of Mice and Men (1939) and One Million B.C. (1940). He wrote to Griffith: "I need help from the production side to select the proper writers, cast, et cetera, and to help me generally in the supervision of these pictures."

Although Griffith eventually disagreed with Roach over the production and departed, Roach later insisted that some of the scenes in the completed film were directed by Griffith. This would make the film the final production in which Griffith was actively involved. However, cast members' accounts recall Griffith directing only the screen tests and costume tests. When Roach advertised the film in late 1939 with Griffith listed as producer, Griffith asked that his name be removed.

Griffith was for decades held in awe by many members of the film industry. He was presented a special Oscar by the Academy of Motion Picture Arts and Sciences in the mid-1930s. In 1946, he made an impromptu visit to the film location of David O. Selznick's epic western Duel in the Sun, where some of his veteran actors—Lillian Gish, Lionel Barrymore and Harry Carey—were cast members. Gish and Barrymore found their old mentor's presence distracting, and became self-conscious; in response, Griffith hid behind the scenery when the two were filming their scenes.

Death 
On the morning of July 23, 1948, Griffith was discovered unconscious in the lobby at the Knickerbocker Hotel in Los Angeles, where he had been living alone. He died of a cerebral hemorrhage at 3:42 PM on the way to a Hollywood hospital. A public memorial service was held in his honor at the Hollywood Masonic Temple. He is buried at Mount Tabor Methodist Church Graveyard in Centerfield, Kentucky. In 1950, The Directors Guild of America provided a stone and bronze monument for his grave site.

Legacy 

Performer and director Charlie Chaplin called Griffith "The Teacher of Us All". Filmmakers such as Alfred Hitchcock, Lev Kuleshov, Jean Renoir, Cecil B. DeMille, King Vidor, Victor Fleming, Raoul Walsh, Carl Theodor Dreyer, Sergei Eisenstein, and Stanley Kubrick have praised Griffith.

Griffith seems to have been the first to understand how certain film techniques could be used to create an expressive language; it gained popular recognition with the release of his The Birth of a Nation (1915). His early shorts —such as Biograph's The Musketeers of Pig Alley (1912), show that Griffith's attention to camera placement and lighting heightened mood and tension. In making Intolerance, Griffith opened up new possibilities for the medium, creating a form that seems to owe more to music than to traditional narrative.

 In the 1951 Philco Television Playhouse episode "The Birth of the Movies", events from Griffith's film career were depicted. Griffith was played by John Newland.
 In 1953 the Directors Guild of America (DGA) instituted the D. W. Griffith Award, its highest honor. However, on December 15, 1999, then DGA President Jack Shea and the DGA National Board announced that the award would be renamed as the "DGA Lifetime Achievement Award". They stated that, although Griffith was extremely talented, they felt his film The Birth of a Nation had "helped foster intolerable racial stereotypes", and that it was thus better not to have the top award in his name.
 In 1975 Griffith was honored on a ten-cent postage stamp by the United States.
 The 1976 American comedy film Nickelodeon in part pays homage to silent film makers, and includes footage from The Birth of a Nation.
 D. W. Griffith Middle School in Los Angeles is named after Griffith. 
 In 2008 the Hollywood Heritage Museum hosted a screening of Griffith's earliest films to commemorate the centennial of his start in film.
 On January 22, 2009, the Oldham History Center in La Grange, Kentucky, opened a 15-seat theatre in Griffith's honor. The theatre features a library of available Griffith films.

Film preservation 
Griffith has six films preserved on the United States National Film Registry deemed as being "culturally, historically, or aesthetically significant". These are Lady Helen's Escapade, A Corner in Wheat (both 1909), The Musketeers of Pig Alley (1912), The Birth of a Nation (1915), Intolerance (1916) and Broken Blossoms (1919).

See also 

 D. W. Griffith filmography
 D. W. Griffith House
 Griffith Ranch (in San Fernando, California)
 List of film directors who studied under D. W. Griffith
 List of Freemasons
 List of people from the Louisville metropolitan area

References

Further reading 
 Seymour Stern, An Index to the Creative Work of D. W. Griffith (London: The British Film Institute, 1944–47)
 Iris Barry and Eileen Bowser, D. W. Griffith: American Film Master (Garden City, NY: Doubleday, 1965)
 Kevin Brownlow, The Parade's Gone By (New York: Alfred A. Knopf, 1968)
 David Robinson, Hollywood in the Twenties (New York: A. S. Barnes & Co, Inc., 1968)
 Lillian Gish, The Movies, Mr. Griffith and Me (Englewood, NJ: Prentice Hall, 1969)
 Robert M. Henderson, D. W. Griffith: His Life and Work (New York: Oxford University Press, 1972)
 Karl Brown, Adventures with D. W. Griffith (New York: Farrar, Straus and Giroux, 1973)
 Edward Wagenknecht and Anthony Slide, The Films of D. W. Griffith (New York: Crown, 1975)
Petrić, Vlada, D.W. Griffith's A Corner in Wheat: A Critical Analysis (Cambridge, MA: University Film Study Center, 1975)
 William K. Everson, American Silent Film (New York: Oxford University Press, 1978)
 Richard Schickel, D. W. Griffith: An American Life (New York: Simon & Schuster, 1984)
 William M. Drew, D. W. Griffith's "Intolerance:" Its Genesis and Its Vision (Jefferson, NJ: McFarland & Company, 1986)
 Tom Gunning, D.W. Griffith and the Origin of the American Narrative: The Early Years at Biograph (Urbana, IL: Illinois University Press, 1994)

External links 

 Bibliography of books and articles about Griffith via UC Berkeley Media Resources Center

 Photo of Griffith as a young man in the 1890s or early 1900s
 D.W. Griffith in the Vanity Fair Hall of Fame (1918)
 A magazine article by the famous director printed in Illustrated World (1921)

 
1875 births
1948 deaths
Academy Honorary Award recipients
American film producers
American film production company founders
American Freemasons
American people of Welsh descent
Methodists from Kentucky
Artists from Los Angeles
Artists from Louisville, Kentucky
Articles containing video clips
Burials in Kentucky
Cinema pioneers
Film directors from Kentucky
Film directors from Los Angeles
Neo-Confederates
People from Oldham County, Kentucky
Silent film directors
United Artists
Western (genre) film directors